Dallspira dalli is a species of sea snail, a marine gastropod mollusk in the family Pseudomelatomidae, the turrids and allies.

Description

Distribution
This marine species occurs off Bella Vista, Panama.

References

 P. Bartsch (1950), New West American Turrids. Nautilus, 63 (3): 87-97, plate 6

External links
 
 

dalli
Gastropods described in 1950